The Synagogue of Philippopolis is an ancient religious building built in ancient Philippopolis, now the city of Plovdiv, in the 3rd century AD. The synagogue is the only ancient Jewish temple found in Bulgaria. Today, only the foundation of the temple on part of the mosaic floor are preserved. The ruins of the ancient temple are located on Maria Luiza blvd.

The synagogue
The synagogue was built in the beginning of the 3rd century AD during the reign of the Severan dynasty as a basilica-like building with three naves (a central one and two aisles) located in north–south direction. The width of the central nave was twice as long as the width of the aisles. The purpose of the building was determined when two mosaic floors were found during archeological researches. They were built one over another with great craftsmanship and extremely rich colors. The floor mosaics depicted images of Menorah and palm branch which are symbolic for the Jewish community and other geometrical shapes. A four-line inscription in Greek was found as well which provide information for the names of the donors of the temple.

The synagogue was almost destroyed during the invasion of the Goths in 250 AD but later it was rebuilt in its original design. The building was destroyed again in the beginning of the 5th century during the persecution of Jews in the Roman Empire. Then, the building was restored and expanded. The second layer of floor mosaics which excluded Jewish symbols is evidence of that period. The synagogue was completely abandoned and destroyed in the end of the 6th century AD.

References

Tourist attractions in Plovdiv
Philippopolis (Thrace)